The Ruby Tower was a six-story building in Manila, Philippines, completed  that collapsed on August 2, 1968, during the Casiguran earthquake killing over 250 people.

Background
The building, constructed at a cost of $250,000, was located on the corner of Doroteo Jose and Teodora Alonso Streets in Santa Cruz, a district in the northern part of Manila. It was of a slab-and-beam design supported by columns, the rear wall with the primary resistance to shear or torsional forces. The  mixed commercial and residential building contained 38 commercial spaces on the lower two floors and 76 residential units on the upper four floors. It housed 600 to 1,000 people.

Collapse and rescue effort
A volunteer force of over 6,000 mobilized to free the victims trapped in the rubble, as there was no government disaster plan in place at the time. Many people were rescued alive, including about 30 who later died from their injuries. At least 260 people were injured. The rescue effort turned to recovery and lasted over a week. Not all of the bodies were identified.

A part of the northern end of the floors one and two remained standing. Its long columns buckled in the earthquake.

By August 4, Philippine soldiers and heavy construction equipment were in use. They were assisted for 10 days by personnel of the United States military. As a result, many holes had to be cut through the concrete with jackhammers and oxygen-acetylene torches to reach the pockets. Philippine and US military, and civilian contractors all participated in this work.

Around 3,000 rescuers, including soldiers and civilians, worked daily, all coordinated by Brigadier General Gaudencio Tobias of the Philippine Army. The nearby Cayetano Arellano high school (formerly Manila North High School) was used as a command center, canteen and rest area, medical clinic and morgue. The US effort was directed by Rear Admiral Draper Kauffman and included US Navy and US Marine Corps personnel from Subic Bay Naval Complex and US Army and US Air Force personnel from Clark Air Force Base.

The Philippine Boys Scouts managed the collection and identification of items of value as they were retrieved. The last of the 268 survivors pulled from the building were two girls, aged 9 and 12, who were found on August 9, having survived in the wreckage for 125 hours. Another 260 bodies were retrieved.

The deaths in the collapse accounted for the majority of all deaths in the earthquake, causing the Casiguran earthquake to be alternatively called the Ruby Tower earthquake.

Analysis and legacy

The collapse was attributed to the design, poor workmanship and concrete quality. Court cases were brought alleging both civil and criminal liability. A case against the construction company was brought before the Supreme Court, where the company was found liable for poor construction including insufficient reinforcement in columns, and joints not built to specifications.

After the collapse of Ruby Tower, the Philippines created the National Committee on Disaster Operation (NCDO), predecessor of the National Disaster Risk Reduction and Management Council (NDRRMC), setting minimum standards for building construction. The first national building code was established in 1972 by the Republic Act 6541, An Act to Ordain and Institute a National Building Code of the Philippines. Five years later, it became the National Building Code of the Philippines by order of then President Ferdinand Marcos Sr.

Memorial
The Ruby Tower Memorial Hall is a two-story structure on the site, made from the portion of the building that remained standing, where the victims are remembered. Built in 1974, the shrine includes 100 black and white photographs of people killed in the collapse.

See also
Ruby Tower Memorial, a memorial in Manila Chinese Cemetery

Notes

References

Buildings and structures in Santa Cruz, Manila
History of Manila
Buildings and structures completed in 1967
Buildings and structures demolished in 1968
1968 Casiguran Earthquake
Casiguran earthquake
Casiguran Earthquake
Building collapses in Asia